"So Freakin' Tight" is a song by British duo Tough Love. It samples the Jodeci song "Freek'n You". It was released on 15 March 2015 as a digital download in the United Kingdom by Island Records. The song debuted at number 11 on the UK Singles Chart and number one on the UK Dance Chart.

Charts

Release history

References

2015 songs
2015 singles
UK garage songs
Island Records singles